Ceramium is a genus of red algae in the Rhodophyta.

Species 
 Ceramium abyssale Petersen 1924
 Ceramium acanthonotum coronata Kleen
 Ceramium acanthonotum transcurrens Holmes & Batters
 Ceramium acanthonotum typica Kjellman
 Ceramium acrocarpum Kützing; Zanardini
 Ceramium adauctum Schousboe
 Ceramium adhaerens Womersley 2003
 Ceramium aduncum Nakamura 1950
 Ceramium affine originale Dawson
 Ceramium affine peninsularis E.Y.Dawson 1950
 Ceramium affine Setchell & N.L.Gardner, 1930
 Ceramium albidum De Candolle 1805
 Ceramium allochrous (Roth) Mertens
 Ceramium alternum Schousboe
 Ceramium amamiense Itono, 1972
 Ceramium annulatum Schousboe
 Ceramium apiculatum J. Agardh 1876
 Ceramium appendiculatum Schousboe
 Ceramium arachnoideum patentissimum Harvey
 Ceramium arborescens J. Agardh 1894
 Ceramium arbuscula (Dillwyn) Bokry
 Ceramium arbuscula C.Agardh
 Ceramium arcticum J. Agardh 1894
 Ceramium arenarium Simons 1966
 Ceramium areschougii Kylin, 1907
 Ceramium armatum (Kützing) Grunow
 Ceramium asparagoides (Woodw.) Roth
 Ceramium aspergillosum J.V.Lamouroux
 Ceramium asperum Roth
 Ceramium atlanticum H.E.Petersen, 1911
 Ceramium atlanticum norvegicum Petersen 1925
 Ceramium atrorubens Liljeblad
 Ceramium atrorubescens Kylin 1938
 Ceramium atrum Schousboe
 Ceramium attenuatum australe Harvey
 Ceramium attenuatum Meneghini; Ruchinger
 Ceramium aucklandicum Kützing 1849
 Ceramium aureum (Linnaeus) Agardh
 Ceramium australe Sonder, 1845
 Ceramium avalonae E.Y. Dawson, 1949
 Ceramium axillare A. P. de Candolle
 Ceramium barbatum (J.E.Smith) Duby, 1833
 Ceramium barbatum minor Schiffner
 Ceramium barbatum nanum Schiffner
 Ceramium barbatum typicum Schiffner
 Ceramium bertholdii Funk 1922
 Ceramium biasolettianum (Kützing) Rabenhorst
 Ceramium bicorne Setchell & Gardner, 1924
 Ceramium bisporum D.L.Ballantine, 1990
 Ceramium boergesenii H.E.Petersen, 1911
 Ceramium borneense Weber-van Bosse 1923
 Ceramium borreri (J.E.Smith) C.Agardh
 Ceramium borreri firmius C.Agardh
 Ceramium botryocarpum A. W. Griffiths ex Harvey 1848
 Ceramium boucheri (Bonnemaison) Duby
 Ceramium boucheri mucilaginosum P.L.Crouan & H.M.Crouan
 Ceramium boucheri tenuissimum P.L.Crouan & H.M.Crouan
 Ceramium boydenii E.S.Gepp, 1904
 Ceramium brasiliense A.B. Joly, 1957
 Ceramium breviarticulatum pellucidum Shperk
 Ceramium breviarticulatum Shperk
 Ceramium brevizonatum caraibicum H.E.Petersen & B¿rgesen 1924
 Ceramium brevizonatum H.E.Petersen, 1918
 Ceramium bulbosum Stackhouse
 Ceramium byssoideum alternatum D.L.Ballantine & Humm 1975
 Ceramium caespitosum maximum Roth
 Ceramium caespitosum Roth
 Ceramium californicum decipiens J.Agardh
 Ceramium californicum J. Agardh, 1894
 Ceramium callipterum Mazoyer, 1938
 Ceramium callithamnium Rafinesque
 Ceramium calyculatum Schousboe
 Ceramium camouii E.Y.Dawson, 1944
 Ceramium cancellatum (Linnaeus) De Candolle 1805
 Ceramium cancellatum proliferum Grunow
 Ceramium capense Kützing 1841
 Ceramium capillaceum Meneghini
 Ceramium capitellatum De Notaris
 Ceramium capricornu (Reinsch) Farlow
 Ceramium casuarinae De Candolle
 Ceramium catenatum (Linnaeus) De Candolle, 1805
 Ceramium catenula (Kützing) Ardissone
 Ceramium caudatum Setchell & N.L.Gardner, 1924
 Ceramium centroceratiforme Simons 1966
 Ceramium ceratophyllum (Roth) Poiret
 Ceramium chalybeum (Roth) C.Agardh
 Ceramium chatamense G.Feldmann
 Ceramium chathamense G. Feldmann 1950
 Ceramium ciliatum (J.Ellis) Ducluzeau, 1806
 Ceramium ciliatum armatissimum Schiffner
 Ceramium ciliatum diaphanum (Kützing) Schiffner
 Ceramium ciliatum echinatum Hauck
 Ceramium ciliatum julaceum Schiffner
 Ceramium ciliatum major Schiffner
 Ceramium ciliatum nanum Schiffner
 Ceramium ciliatum nudiusculum (Kützing) Schiffner
 Ceramium ciliatum polyspermum (Sperk.) Woronichin
 Ceramium ciliatum proliferum C.Agardh
 Ceramium ciliatum robustum (J. Agardh) Mazoyer
 Ceramium ciliatum secundatum (Kützing) Schiffner
 Ceramium ciliatum subjulaceum Schiffner
 Ceramium cimbricum flaccidum (H.E.Petersen) Furnari & Serio 1996
 Ceramium cimbricum H. E. Petersen 1924
 Ceramium cingulatum Weber-van Bosse 1923
 Ceramium cingulum Meneses 1995
 Ceramium circinatum (Kützing) J.Agardh 1851
 Ceramium circinatum boreale Foslie
 Ceramium circinatum confluens (Kützing) Ardissone 1883
 Ceramium circinatum decipiens Schiffner
 Ceramium circinatum divaricatum Foslie
 Ceramium circinatum duriusculum (Kützing) Ardissone
 Ceramium circinatum genuinum Foslie
 Ceramium circinatum infernecorticatum Lakowitz
 Ceramium circinatum rigidum Foslie
 Ceramium circinatum syntrophum Kützing
 Ceramium circinatum tenue Foslie
 Ceramium circinatum transcurrens (Kützing) Schiffner
 Ceramium cirrhosum (Wulf.) C.Agardh
 Ceramium clarionense Setchell & N.L. Gardner, 1930
 Ceramium clavaeforme Poiret
 Ceramium clavellosum (Turner) Roth
 Ceramium clavigerum Bonnemaison
 Ceramium clavulatum crispulum Montagne
 Ceramium clavulatum inerme (Kützing) Weber-van Bosse; Kützing
 Ceramium cliftonianum J. Agardh 1876
 Ceramium coccineum (Ellis) De Candolle; (Hudson) Bory; Draparnaud; Roth ex Link 1806; Zanardini
 Ceramium codicola J. Agardh, 1894
 Ceramium codii (H.Richards) Mazoyer, 1938
 Ceramium comptum B¿rgesen 1924
 Ceramium confluens (Kützing) Ardissone
 Ceramium congestum Bonnemaison
 Ceramium connivens Zanardini
 Ceramium contortum longinum (G. Karsten) Sournia 1966
 Ceramium corallinum (J.Murray) Bory; Delle Chiaje
 Ceramium cormacii Serio, Catra, Collodoro & Nisi, 2011
 Ceramium corniculatum Montagne 1861
 Ceramium cornutum P.Dangeard, 1952
 Ceramium corymbosum (E.B.) C.Agardh; J.Agardh
 Ceramium cristatum Meneghini
 Ceramium crouanianum J.Agardh, 1894
 Ceramium cruciatum F.S. Collins & Hervey, 1917
 Ceramium cupulatum Womersley, 1978
 Ceramium dalmaticum Meneghini
 Ceramium danicum Petersen 1924
 Ceramium dasytrichum Montagne
 Ceramium daviesii (Dillwyn) Bonnemaison; (Dillwyn) C.Agardh
 Ceramium daviesii secundatum (Lyngbye) Duby
 Ceramium dawsonii A. B. Joly 1957
 Ceramium decurrens majus Kützing Harvey
 Ceramium derbesii Solier ex Kützing 1847
 Ceramium deslongchampsii Chauvin ex Duby 1830
 Ceramium deslongchampsii hooperi (Harvey) W.R.Taylor
 Ceramium deslongchampsii semiascendens J.Luca
 Ceramium deslongchampsii viminarium Melv.ex G.Murray
 Ceramium diaphanoides Kützing
 Ceramium diaphanum (Lightfoot) Roth, 1806
 Ceramium diaphanum arachnoides C.Agardh
 Ceramium diaphanum aucklandicum J.D.Hooker & Harvey
 Ceramium diaphanum capense Simons
 Ceramium diaphanum capricornu (Reinsch) Foslie 1893
 Ceramium diaphanum corticatulostrictum Kylin
 Ceramium diaphanum corticatulum H.E.Petersen
 Ceramium diaphanum decipiens Schiffner
 Ceramium diaphanum elegans (Roth) Roth 1806
 Ceramium diaphanum fastigiatum (Roth) Trevisan
 Ceramium diaphanum gracile Ardissone
 Ceramium diaphanum herbaceum (Roth) Roth
 Ceramium diaphanum indicum Feldmann-Mazoyer 1952
 Ceramium diaphanum minor P.L.Crouan & H.M.Crouan 1865
 Ceramium diaphanum patentissima Foslie
 Ceramium diaphanum pilosum (Roth) C.Agardh
 Ceramium diaphanum pulcher Shperk
 Ceramium diaphanum radiculosum (Grunow) H.E.Petersen
 Ceramium diaphanum rigidum A.W.Griffiths & Harvey
 Ceramium diaphanum serpens Montagne
 Ceramium diaphanum strictotenuissimum (H.E.Petersen) Kylin
 Ceramium diaphanum strictum Celan & Serbanescu 1969
 Ceramium diaphanum typicum H.E.Petersen
 Ceramium diaphanum virescens Lyngbye
 Ceramium diaphanum zostericola acrocarpum (Kützing) Feldmann-Mazoyer 1941
 Ceramium diaphanum zostericola H.E.Petersen
 Ceramium dichotomum (Linnaeus) Roth
 Ceramium didymum Bonnemaison
 Ceramium diffusum (Hudson) Stackhouse
 Ceramium digeneae DeNotaris
 Ceramium digitatum (Hudson) Stackh.
 Ceramium dillwynii (Weber & Mohr) Roth
 Ceramium discorticatum Heydrich 1893
 Ceramium divergens J.Agardh 1894
 Ceramium dorsiventrale Hommersand, 1963
 Ceramium dozei Hariot 1887
 Ceramium ducluzeaui Bonnemaison
 Ceramium ducluzeaui miniatum Bonnemaison
 Ceramium ducluzeaui versicolor Bonnemaison
 Ceramium dumosertum R. E. Norris & Abbott 1992
 Ceramium dumosum Mertens
 Ceramium duriusculum (Kützing) Rabenhorst
 Ceramium echinophorum Meneghini
 Ceramium echionotum J. Agardh, 1844
 Ceramium echionotum azoricum (Meneghini) Piccone 1884
 Ceramium echionotum mediterraneum Mazoyer 1938
 Ceramium echionotum transcurrens (Kützing) Piccone
 Ceramium edule Stackhouse
 Ceramium elegans litorale Celan & Serbanescu 1959
 Ceramium elegans longe-articulata Celan & Serbanescu 1959
 Ceramium elegans nanum Schiffner
 Ceramium elegans tenerior Schiffner
 Ceramium elongatum (Hudson) Roth 1806
 Ceramium elongatum denudata (C.Agardh) Duby
 Ceramium equisetifolium (Lightf.) De Candolle
 Ceramium equisetoides E.Y. Dawson, 1944
 Ceramium erumpens Meneghini
 Ceramium evermannii Setchell & N.L. Gardner, 1930
 Ceramium excellens J. Agardh, 1894
 Ceramium fastigiatum Roussel 1806
 Ceramium fastigiatum pubescens (Kützing) Piccone
 Ceramium fastigiramosum S.M.Boo & I.K.Lee, 1985
 Ceramium felicii Gaillon
 Ceramium ferrugineum compactius C.Agardh
 Ceramium fibrillosum (Dillwyn) Mertens
 Ceramium fibrosum Roth
 Ceramium filamentosum continuum C.Agardh
 Ceramium filamentosum friabile P.L.Crouan & H.M.Crouan 1867
 Ceramium filiculum Harvey ex Womersley, 1978
 Ceramium flabelligerum Agardh F.Debray
 Ceramium flagellare (Esper) Ruchinger
 Ceramium flagelliferum Kützing
 Ceramium flavicans Schousboe
 Ceramium flavum Schousboe
 Ceramium floccosum (Fl.Dan.) Roth
 Ceramium floribundum Kützing
 Ceramium floridanum J. Agardh, 1894
 Ceramium forcipatum A.P.de Candolle, 1805
 Ceramium forcipatum ciliatum (Ellis) A. P. de Candolle
 Ceramium forcipatum glabellum A.P.de Candolle 1805
 Ceramium fosliei (Petersen) Petersen 1935
 Ceramium fractum elongatim (Roth) Bory
 Ceramium fragile Ardissone
 Ceramium friabile Schousboe
 Ceramium fructiculosum (Wulfen) Stackhouse; Roth, 1981
 Ceramium fruticulosum rubroides Petersen 1908
 Ceramium fucoides (Hudson) De Candolle
 Ceramium fujiianum M.B.Barros-Barreto & C. A. Maggs, 2006
 Ceramium furcatum (Petersen) Petersen 1925
 Ceramium furcellatum (Linnaeus) Wiggers; Kützing
 Ceramium fuscum (Hudson) Roth
 Ceramium gaditanum (Clemente) Cremades, J. (F.Debray) Cremades 1990
 Ceramium gaditanum mediterraneum (Debray) Cremades 1990
 Ceramium gardneri Kylin, 1941
 Ceramium gelatinosum Schousboe
 Ceramium giacconei Cormaci & G. Furnari 1991
 Ceramium gibbosum Meneghini
 Ceramium giganteum Meneghini
 Ceramium gigartinum (Linnaeus) Roth
 Ceramium glanduliferum Kylin 1938
 Ceramium glomeratum De Candolle
 Ceramium gracile De Candolle 1805
 Ceramium gracilliferum Griffiths & Harvey
 Ceramium gracillimum C.Agardh 1824
 Ceramium gracillimum byssoideum (Harvey) Mazoyer
 Ceramium graecum Lazaridou & Boudouresque 1992
 Ceramium granulosum (E.B.) C.Agardh
 Ceramium grateloupii Bonnemaison; Duby
 Ceramium griffitsianum (E.B.) J.Agardh
 Ceramium guttatum Bonnemaison, 1828
 Ceramium gymnogonium Meneghini
 Ceramium hamatispinum E.Y. Dawson, 1950
 Ceramium hellenicum Giaccone
 Ceramium helminthochortos (Schwendimann) Roth
 Ceramium heterospinum B. Subramanian, 1985
 Ceramium hirsutum Roth
 Ceramium hispidum Schousboe
 Ceramium hoodii W.R. Taylor, 1945
 Ceramium hookeri (Dillwyn) C.Agardh
 Ceramium horridulum P.C.Silva, 1972
 Ceramium horridum Meneghini 1844
 Ceramium hospitans Zanardini
 Ceramium howellii Setchell & N.L. Gardner, 1937
 Ceramium hyalinum Rabenhorst
 Ceramium hystrix (Kützing) Frauenfeld
 Ceramium implexum Schousboe
 Ceramium inconspicuum Zanardini, 1840
 Ceramium inflexum Roth
 Ceramium inkyui T.O.Cho, S.Fredericq, & S.M.Boo, 2003
 Ceramium interruptum Setchell & Gardner, 1924
 Ceramium interruptum nigrescens C.Agardh 1824
 Ceramium involutum Kützing 1849
 Ceramium irregulare Kützing 1849
 Ceramium isogonum Harvey 1855
 Ceramium japonicum Okamura, 1896
 Ceramium johnstonii Setchell & Gardner, 1924
 Ceramium jolyi (Daz-Piferrer) D.L.Ballantine & M.J.Wynne 1968
 Ceramium julaceum (Kützing) Rabenhorst 1847
 Ceramium juliae A.J.K. Millar, 2002
 Ceramium kellneri Meneghini
 Ceramium kondoi Yendo 1920
 Ceramium kondoi abbreviatum Nakamura 1950
 Ceramium kondoi ambiguum Nakamura 1950
 Ceramium kondoi trichotomum Nakamura 1950
 Ceramium kondoi typicum Nakamura
 Ceramium koreanum Boo & I.K.Lee, 1986
 Ceramium koronense Trono, 1972
 Ceramium krameri G.R.South & Skelton, 2000
 Ceramium laingii Reinbold ex Laing 1905
 Ceramium lamourouxii Bonnemaison
 Ceramium lamourouxii Duby
 Ceramium laterale Schousboe
 Ceramium ledermannii Pilger, 1911
 Ceramium lenormandii Montague
 Ceramium lenticulare Womersley 1978
 Ceramium lentiforme A. J. K. Millar 1990
 Ceramium leptacanthum (Kützing) Zanardini
 Ceramium leptocladum Schiffner 1933
 Ceramium leptophloeum Kützing
 Ceramium leptosiphon Pilger, 1920
 Ceramium leptozonum M.A. Howe, 1918
 Ceramium lessonii Kützing
 Ceramium leutzelburgii australis A.B.Joly 1965
 Ceramium leutzelburgii Schmidt, 1924
 Ceramium linum (Roth) De Candolle
 Ceramium lobatum (Kützing) Shperk
 Ceramium longissimum (S. G. Gmelin) Roth
 Ceramium longissimum flagellare (Esper) Roth
 Ceramium loureiri C. Agardh 1824
 Ceramium loureiroi C.Agardh
 Ceramium lucidum Grateloup
 Ceramium luetzelburgii australe A.B.Joly 1965
 Ceramium luetzelburgii O. C. Schmidt 1924
 Ceramium lumbricale (Roth) Lamouroux
 Ceramium macilentum J.Agardh, 1894
 Ceramium macrocarpum Kützing
 Ceramium macrogonium (Kützing) Ardissone
 Ceramium macrotrichum Feldmann-Mazoyer, 1952
 Ceramium manorense P. Anand, 1943
 Ceramium marshallense E. Y. Dawson 1957
 Ceramium maryae tenuior Weber- Van Bosse
 Ceramium maryae Weber-van Bosse 1923
 Ceramium mauritianum Feldmann-Mazoyer, 1952
 Ceramium mertensii (Turner) De Candolle; (Turner) Roth
 Ceramium metcalfii C. K. Tseng
 Ceramium microcarpon Schousboe
 Ceramium molle Roth
 Ceramium monacanthum J.Agardh, 1894
 Ceramium monile crassior J.Agardh
 Ceramium multicapsulare (Dillwyn) C.Agardh
 Ceramium multijugum Jaasund, 1970
 Ceramium myriophyllum Poiret
 Ceramium nakamurae E.Y.Dawson 1954
 Ceramium nanum Kuehne 1946
 Ceramium nayalii Nasr, 1941
 Ceramium nitens (C. Agardh) J. Agardh 1851
 Ceramium nodiferum moniliforme Shperk
 Ceramium nodulosum De Candolle; Ducluzeau 1850
 Ceramium nodulosum continuum Ruprecht
 Ceramium nodulosum implexo-contortum Solier
 Ceramium nodulosum minus Ruprecht
 Ceramium nodulosum tenue (C. Agardh) Serio
 Ceramium nudiusculum (Kützing) Rabenhorst 1847
 Ceramium obesum E.Y. Dawson, 1950
 Ceramium obsoletum C. Agardh 1828
 Ceramium opacum Rafinesque
 Ceramium oppositum Schousboe
 Ceramium opuntia Schousboe
 Ceramium ornatum Setchell & Gardner, 1930
 Ceramium orsinianum Meneghini
 Ceramium orthocladum maximum Schiffner 1938
 Ceramium orthocladum nanum Schiffner 1938
 Ceramium orthocladum Schiffner 1926
 Ceramium pacificum (Collins) Kylin, 1925
 Ceramium pallens Zanardini
 Ceramium pallidum (Ngeli ex Kützing) Maggs & Hommersand 1993
 Ceramium paniculatum Okamura 1921
 Ceramium papenfussianum Simons 1966
 Ceramium parvulum (Zanardini ex Frauenfeld) Grunow, 1867
 Ceramium pedicellatum (Duby) J. Agardh, C. Agardh, 1817
 Ceramium pedicellatum minus Desmaziâres
 Ceramium pediculum Suhr
 Ceramium penicillatum Areschoug 1849
 Ceramium pennatum P.L.Crouan & H.M.Crouan, 1852
 Ceramium periconicum T.O.Cho & Riosmena-Rodrguez 2008
 Ceramium personatum Setchell & N.L. Gardner, 1930
 Ceramium petitii Feldmann-Mazoyer
 Ceramium pictaviense Del?tre
 Ceramium piliferum Schousboe
 Ceramium pilosum (Roth) Naccari
 Ceramium pinastroides (Gmelin) Stackhouse
 Ceramium pinnulatum C .Agardh
 Ceramium planum Kützing 1849
 Ceramium pleurosporum Schiffner 1938
 Ceramium pleurosporum nanum Schiffner prov.
 Ceramium plicatum (Hudson) Roth; Meneghini
 Ceramium plocamium (Gmelin) Roth
 Ceramium pluma (Dillwyn) C.Agardh
 Ceramium plumula subverticillatum Bonnemaison
 Ceramium pluvinatum Mertens
 Ceramium poeppigianum Grunow 1868 '1867'
 Ceramium poeppigianum unilaterale Hommersand 1963
 Ceramium polyceras (Kützing) Zanardini 1847
 Ceramium polygonum (Kützing) Shperk
 Ceramium polyspermum P.L.Crouan & H.M.Crouan; Shperk
 Ceramium procumbens Setchell & N.L. Gardner, 1924
 Ceramium proliferum (Lyngbye) H.E.Petersen; Yates
 Ceramium proliferum secundatum (Lyngbye) H.E.Petersen
 Ceramium prorepens Grunow
 Ceramium prostratum E.Y. Dawson, 1963
 Ceramium pseudostrictum Schiffner 1938
 Ceramium pseudostrictum major Schiffner
 Ceramium pseudostrictum minor Schiffner
 Ceramium pseudostrictum nanum Schiffner
 Ceramium pteroma Schousboe
 Ceramium puberulum Sonder 1845
 Ceramium pulchellum chalybeum (Roth) C.Agardh
 Ceramium pulvereum (Dillwyn) C.Agardh
 Ceramium punctiforme Setchell 1924
 Ceramium purpurascens Wallroth
 Ceramium purpureum Delle Chiaje
 Ceramium purum Roth
 Ceramium pusillum Harvey 1863
 Ceramium pusillum lanceolatum J.Agardh
 Ceramium pyramidatum Schousboe
 Ceramium pyridioides G.Feldmann
 Ceramium racemosum Schousboe
 Ceramium radiculosum major Schiffner
 Ceramium radiculosum venetum Schiffner
 Ceramium ramulosum nanum Schiffner
 Ceramium recticorticum E.Y. Dawson, 1950
 Ceramium repens saxatile Bonnemaison
 Ceramium repens spinosissimum Zanardini
 Ceramium reptans T.O.Cho & Fredericq, 2006
 Ceramium rescissum Kylin 1907
 Ceramium rhizophorum (Montagne) De Toni
 Ceramium rigidum Ardissone
 Ceramium rintelsianum G.R.South & Skelton, 2000
 Ceramium riosmenae B.Y.Won & T.O.Cho, 2011
 Ceramium rosenvingei Petersen 1908
 Ceramium rosenvingii H.E.Petersen
 Ceramium rosenvingii intermedium H.E.Petersen
 Ceramium rosenvingii tenue H.E.Petersen
 Ceramium rosenvingii transgrediens H.E.Petersen
 Ceramium roseum majus Roth
 Ceramium roseum viscidulum Bonnemaison
 Ceramium rubrum ambiguum Schiffner
 Ceramium rubrum barbatum (Ardissone) Hauck; G.Feldmann-Mazoyer 1941
 Ceramium rubrum botryoides Montagne 1841
 Ceramium rubrum corymbiferum (Bonnemaison) J.Agardh 1851, 1876; Hariot
 Ceramium rubrum decurrens (Kützing) J.Agardh
 Ceramium rubrum diaphanum Gobi
 Ceramium rubrum diaphanum P.L.Crouan & H.M.Crouan
 Ceramium rubrum divaricatum C.Agardh
 Ceramium rubrum fasciculatum J. Agardh; Wollny
 Ceramium rubrum firmum C.Agardh
 Ceramium rubrum genuinum Kjellman
 Ceramium rubrum implexo-contortum (Solier) Feldmann-Mazoyer
 Ceramium rubrum implexocontortum Solier
 Ceramium rubrum irregulare H.E.Petersen
 Ceramium rubrum lineare H.E.Petersen
 Ceramium rubrum lineatum H.E.Petersen
 Ceramium rubrum maculatum S.F.Gray
 Ceramium rubrum major C.Agardh
 Ceramium rubrum membranaceum C.Agardh
 Ceramium rubrum nodulosum Montagne
 Ceramium rubrum pedicellatum (De Candolle) Duby; J. Agardh
 Ceramium rubrum pedicellatum Shperk
 Ceramium rubrum proliferum (Lyngbye) J.Agardh; Hariot 1889
 Ceramium rubrum ramellosum Ardissone
 Ceramium rubrum repens (Zanardini) Zanardini
 Ceramium rubrum secundatum (Lyngbye) C.Agardh; H.E.Petersen; Harvey; J.Agardh;  Kützing; H. E. Petersen
 Ceramium rubrum subcorticatum H.E.Petersen
 Ceramium rubrum tenue (C.Agardh) Ardissone 1824; Kützing
 Ceramium rubrum typicum H.E.Petersen; Reinke
 Ceramium rubrum virgatum C.Agardh 1824
 Ceramium rugosum J.V.Lamouroux
 Ceramium rupestre tenuissimum J.V.Lamouroux
 Ceramium sandrianum Meneghini
 Ceramium saviniae Feldmann-Mazoyer, 1952
 Ceramium scandinavicum Petersen 1924
 Ceramium scoparium (Linnaeus) Roth
 Ceramium scorpioides (Hudson) Roth
 Ceramium secundatum Lyngbye, 1819
 Ceramium septentrionale Petersen 1911
 Ceramium serpens Setchell & N.L.Gardner, 1924
 Ceramium setaceum (Hudson) Duby; Wallroth; Ruchinger
 Ceramium setchellii Lucas, 1935
 Ceramium setosum Schousboe
 Ceramium shepherdii Womersley, 1978
 Ceramium shuttleworthianum (Kützing) Rabenhorst 1847
 Ceramium siliquosum (Kützing) Maggs & Hommersand 1993
 Ceramium siliquosum acrocarpum (G.Mazoyer) G.Furnari 1999
 Ceramium siliquosum elegans (Roth) G. Furnari 1999
 Ceramium siliquosum lophophorum (Feldman-Mazoyer) Serio
 Ceramium siliquosum minusculum (G.Mazoyer) Garreta et al. 2001
 Ceramium siliquosum zostericola (Thuret) G.Furnari 1999
 Ceramium simplex C.Agardh
 Ceramium sinicola interruptum (Setch.& Gard.) Daws. 1944
 Ceramium sinicola johnstonii (Setchell & N.L.Gardner) Dawson 1944
 Ceramium sinicola Setchell & Gardner, 1924
 Ceramium skottsbergii H. Petersen 1924
 Ceramium spicatum Schousboe
 Ceramium spiniferum Kützing
 Ceramium spinosopilosum Kützing 1863
 Ceramium spinosum (Linnaeus) Ruchinger
 Ceramium spinulosum (Kützing) Rabenhorst; Biasoletto
 Ceramium spyridioides G. Feldmann 1950
 Ceramium squamosum Rafinesque
 Ceramium squarrosum (Harvey) J.Agardh
 Ceramium stichidiosum J. Agardh, 1876
 Ceramium stichidiosum scopulorum Laing 1909
 Ceramium stichidiosum smithii Laing 1909
 Ceramium strictum acrocarpum Kützing
 Ceramium strictum breviarticulatum Ardissone
 Ceramium strictum corticatulostrictum (Kylin) Sjstedt
 Ceramium strictum delicatum J. Agardh
 Ceramium strictum divaricatum Holmes & Batters
 Ceramium strictum minusculum Mazoyer
 Ceramium strictum nanum Schiffner
 Ceramium strictum proliferum F.S.Collins
 Ceramium strictum strictotenuissimum H.E.Petersen
 Ceramium strictum strictum J.Agardh
 Ceramium strictum vertebrale (H.E.Petersen) H.E.Petersen
 Ceramium strobiliforme G.W.Lawson & D.M.John, 1982
 Ceramium subcartilagineum J.Agardh
 Ceramium subfuscum (Woodw.) Stackhouse
 Ceramium subsimplex Schousboe
 Ceramium subtile J. Agardh, 1851
 Ceramium subverticillatum (Grunow) Weber-van Bosse, 1923
 Ceramium subvirgatum Zanardini 1854
 Ceramium suhrianum P.C. Silva, 1996
 Ceramium syntrophum (Kützing) Ardissone
 Ceramium tasmanicum (Kützing) Womersley 1978
 Ceramium templetonii Setchell & N.L.Gardner, 1937
 Ceramium tenellum (Vahl) C.Agardh
 Ceramium tenerrimum (G.Martens) Okamura, 1921
 Ceramium tenerrimum brevizonatum (H. E. Petersen) Feldmann-Mazoyer
 Ceramium tenue (J.Agardh) J.Agardh, 1894
 Ceramium tenuicorne (Kützing) Waern 1952
 Ceramium tenuicorticatum Konno, 1974
 Ceramium tenuissimum divaricatum (P. L. Crouan & H. M. Crouan ex J. Agardh) Foslie 1893
 Ceramium tenuissimum J. Agardh
 Ceramium tenuissimum moniliforme (Sperk.) Woronichin
 Ceramium tenuissimum pygmaeum (Kützing) Hauck 1888
 Ceramium tenuissimum uniforme Bonnemaison
 Ceramium tetricum pectinatum C. Agardh
 Ceramium thymifolium Schousboe
 Ceramium tortuosum Ducluzeau
 Ceramium torulosum Roth
 Ceramium tranquebariense Roth
 Ceramium tranquillum Meneses 1998
 Ceramium transcurrens (Kützing) Ardissone
 Ceramium transfugum (Kützing) Ardissone
 Ceramium trichocladis C.Agardh
 Ceramium truncatum H.Petersen, 1936
 Ceramium tubulosum Roth
 Ceramium tumidulum Meneghini
 Ceramium turneri radicans Bonnemaison
 Ceramium uncinatum Harvey 1855
 Ceramium ungulatum (Kützing) Hariot 1889
 Ceramium uniforme (Esper) Ruchinger; Meneghini
 Ceramium unilaterale Schousboe
 Ceramium upolense G.R.South & Skelton, 2000
 Ceramium urceolatum (Dillwyn) Jrgens
 Ceramium uruguayense W.R. Taylor, 1960
 Ceramium vagans P. C. Silva 1987
 Ceramium variegatum (Kützing) Okamura 1932
 Ceramium vatovai Schiffner, 1938
 Ceramium venetum Zanardini
 Ceramium verrucosum Roth
 Ceramium vertebrale H.E.Petersen
 Ceramium verticillatum (Light.) Ducluzeau, (Lightf.) De Candolle; Delle Chiaje
 Ceramium vestitum Harvey, 1855
 Ceramium vietnamense Pham-Hong H 1969
 Ceramium villosum (Hudson) Poiret
 Ceramium violaceum tenuius Roth
 Ceramium virgatum J.D. Hooker & Harvey, 1848; Roth, 1797
 Ceramium viride Filarszky
 Ceramium viscainoense E.Y. Dawson, 1950
 Ceramium wilsonii Womersley 2003
 Ceramium womersleyi R. E. Norris & I. A. Abbott 1992
 Ceramium wulfenii Roth
 Ceramium zacae Setchell & N.L. Gardner, 1937

Synonymy 
 Ceramium elegans (Roth) Ducluzeau 1805 is a synonym of Ceramium diaphanum var. elegans (Roth) Roth
 Ceramium elegans var. diaphanoideum Celan & Serbanescu is a synonym of Ceramium siliquosum (Kützing) Maggs & Hommersand
 Ceramium elegans var. fastigiatum Celan & Serbanescu 1959 is a synonym of Ceramium cimbricum H.E.Petersen
 Ceramium elegans f. longiarticulata Celan & Serbanescu is a synonym of Ceramium siliquosum (Kützing) Maggs & Hommersand

References

External links 
 
 algaebase.org (retrieved 22 July 2016)

 
Lists of algae
Taxonomic lists (species)